Sir Cuthbert Wilfred Whitaker (26 May 1873 – 1950) was editor of Whitaker's Almanack. He held the position for fifty-five years, succeeding his father Joseph Whitaker when he died in 1895, and was in turn succeeded by a nephew on his death.

He was Chairman of the City of London Food Control Committee during the Second World War, and was knighted in 1946 for services to the City of London Corporation.

Whitaker was a Councilman for the ward of Farringdon Within from 1905. In 1944 he led the initiative to found the Guildhall Historical Association on 16 June 1944.

References

F. A. Marteau, ed., Who's who in press, publicity, printing, 1939
News Chronicle obituary clipping, 1950.

1873 births
1950 deaths
British book editors
Almanac compilers
Publishers (people) from London
Councilmen of the City of London
Whitaker family